Brukhin (also Bruchin) is an Israeli settlement located in the West Bank, about 10 km from the Palestinian city of Bruqin, whose lands were confiscated in order to construct Brukhin.

Over 101 Orthodox Jewish families are living in Brukhin. A further 100 families are due to move in as the settlement expands (2015).

The international community considers Israeli settlements in the West Bank illegal under international law, but the Israeli government disputes this.

History
According to ARIJ, Israel confiscated 332 dunams of land from the nearby Arab village of Bruqin in order to construct Brukhin.

Brukhin was founded in 1998 on non-private land claimed as state land by Israel as a trailer neighbourhood, and developed by one of the founding members, Amishai Shav-Tal, in October 2000, within the territory administered as part of its municipality by the Shomron Regional Council. The Sasson Report established that the Brukhin outpost was an unauthorized Israeli settlement. The report also said that $785,000 was spent on Brukhin's infrastructure and public buildings. Construction in the village was frozen in 2012 by an order from the Israeli High Court. In 2012 the Israeli state provided the illegal outpost with official authorization.

Popular culture
In July 2015 a "come and join" video was released on YouTube featuring a song sung by the families of Brukhin.

See also
Bruqin

Footnotes

Religious Israeli settlements
Populated places established in 1998
1998 establishments in the Palestinian territories
Israeli settlements in the West Bank